Pierre-Hugues Herbert was the defending champion but withdrew before the tournament began.

Jerzy Janowicz won the title after defeating Quentin Halys 6–4, 6–4 in the final.

Seeds

Draw

Finals

Top half

Bottom half

References
Main Draw
Qualifying Draw

Trofeo Faip-Perrel - Singles
Trofeo Faip–Perrel